Aubrey Morgan O'Day (born February 11, 1984) is an American singer and reality television personality, best known for being a member of the girl group Danity Kane. Following discord among Danity Kane and with her mentor at the time, P. Diddy, O'Day was fired from the group in 2008, but reunited with them in 2013 before a second disbandment. Danity Kane reunited in 2018 as a trio. She has also performed in the duo Dumblonde with former Danity Kane bandmate Shannon Bex since 2015.

O'Day has modeled for magazines such as Blender and Playboy, and performed on Broadway in Hairspray. In 2011, she signed a solo record deal with SRC/Universal Motown Records, and released her debut EP Between Two Evils in 2013.

Additionally, O'Day has made appearances on reality television shows, including the fifth season of Celebrity Apprentice, Famously Single, Ex on the Beach, and the British Celebrity Big Brother 18.

Early life
O'Day began performing at age five. "I lived on the stage, and even at six, slept behind the seats of the theatre," she stated in an interview. According to her mother, when O'Day was four, she was at a performance of The Nutcracker and started to cry. Her mother asked her what was wrong and O'Day replied, "I'm sad that I'm sitting here and not up on stage." O'Day recalls that moment as the one in which she "officially" realized her love for entertainment.

O'Day played lead characters in various musical productions, including Dorothy in The Wizard of Oz, Carmen in Fame, Sandy in Grease, Liesl in The Sound of Music, Tzeitel in Fiddler on the Roof, and Mimi in Rent. She also appeared in Annie. O'Day's childhood leaned heavily toward auditions and acting gigs more than school. The Notorious B.I.G. and Sean "Puffy" Combs were her primary influences as a child.

O'Day attended La Quinta High School. She later majored in political science and drama and graduated with a degree in political science from University of California, Irvine, and is a member of the Alpha Chi Omega sorority.

Career

2004–08: Making the Band 3 and Danity Kane

O'Day was discovered in 2004 on the MTV reality show Making the Band 3, founded by Sean "Diddy" Combs, and emerged as the show's breakout star. During Season 2 of Making the Band 3 while the competition was still ongoing, Blender magazine contacted O'Day to pose for their September 2005 issue. The magazine described her as the contestant "who bared calm resolve and tanned hip bones in beating out almost 10,000 girls for the chance at singing and strutting in a P. Diddy–steered girl group". O'Day expressed anxiety about competing to be in the group. "I've been in the 'cut' situation several times," she stated. "It's hard to stand in a room and know that the dream I want is all in [Combs's] hands." O'Day had dropped out of college in order to participate in the competition.

After seeing her dance, Combs was convinced that O'Day had "Black in her family" and further expressed this sentiment after watching her sing a version of "At Last" at a club during Season 1 of the show. This, along with what viewers saw as natural charisma, helped endear her to become a consistent favorite among judges and fans. Former Backstreet Boys and 'N Sync manager Johnny Wright, who served as one of the judges on the show, stated from her first audition in Los Angeles they knew that she was "a star".

O'Day was eventually chosen to be in the group, and was the first member included. The band became known as Danity Kane, and their first album debuted on August 22, 2006, at #1 on the Billboard 200 charts. The group was the opening act for Christina Aguilera on the U.S. leg of her Back to Basics Tour with the Pussycat Dolls.

O'Day's fame and physical features found appealing by magazines helped her broaden her career beyond the group. In addition to other musical projects, she posed for several "sexy" magazine spreads. On the August 28, 2008, episode of Making the Band, due to being consistently frustrated with O'Day's "oversexed" new image, Combs called O'Day "one of the worst dancers" in Danity Kane. He told O'Day that she no longer looked like the girl he signed and that she used to be one of the best. Combs bluntly accused O'Day of trying to expand her fame at the expense of the entire group, and that she liked flaunting her breasts and wearing big hair, referring to an incident where she had rubbed her cleavage on the arm of a television host. He asked himself why he was keeping O'Day in the group.

On the October 7, 2008, episode of Making the Band, after continued debate with O'Day about the well-being of the group, Combs declared O'Day no longer a member of Danity Kane. An official announcement, however, had not been made from Bad Boy Records. When asked by Boston Herald whether she was still in the group, O'Day was reluctant to answer and stated, "I can't comment on anything, I'm sorry."

Speculation arose that Combs firing O'Day was a ratings ploy and that he had no intention of truly dismissing her. When discussing her career, O'Day would still refer to herself as a "member of a girl band" and "the official party girl of Danity Kane". On the October 14, 2008, episode of Making the Band, however, O'Day's departure from the group was confirmed, as well as bandmate and then-best friend D. Woods. In the live section of the episode, Combs explained that the reason he let O'Day go was that she was not the same person he signed, that the fame had changed her. When O'Day came on to reply, she stated: "I would rather be hated every damn day of my life for being real than loved for being something I'm not." In a backstage interview before the finale, she said:Tonight is a representation of the end of a chapter in my life; it's not the end of the book. I will do everything possible to make my mark on this industry, and Danity Kane and [Combs] provided me with this amazing opportunity to go out and really touch people's hearts. I think the way that we were able to inspire people was something that I will never be able to achieve in that way again in my life.

MTV News gauged fan reactions to the dismissals of O'Day and Woods. Fans left impassioned, long and detailed comments on the MTV News site about their discontent regarding the group's breakup. The 2009 season of Making the Band was expected to include new members auditioning as "replacements" for O'Day and Woods in Danity Kane, but instead showed the official end of the group. The complete breakup of the group was originally thought to be the result of O'Day and Woods, along with group member Shannon Bex, declining the offer to return to the series and the group. This was later argued by O'Day, who stated that while she was unsure if Woods was asked back, she herself was not asked to return. O'Day said that if offered, she would have returned and is not against returning. She was officially released from her Bad Boy Records contract by Combs in the April 16, 2009, episode of Making the Band.

On the April 23, 2009, finale of the show, O'Day returned with three former members of the group to clear up any misconceptions about the group's breakup. She said that she has forgiven being released from the group, and people who blamed her for the group's demise. Combs said that if he ever puts the group back together, O'Day and the group's other four members would be returning as Danity Kane.

2008–12: Solo career and return to reality television 
O'Day began the role of Amber Von Tussle in the Broadway musical Hairspray on July 18, 2008. She appeared in the 2009 comedy American High School costarring Nikki Ziering, and also joined the cast of Jerry Mitchell's musical Peepshow in the role of "Peep Diva" at the Planet Hollywood Resort & Casino in Las Vegas, Nevada from September 2009 to late December 2009. Additionally, O'Day was featured on the Donnie Wahlberg single "I Got It". She recorded a remastered version of Sharam's remix hit "Party All the Time" and released a track titled "Never Fallin".

On the April 23, 2009, finale of Making the Band, O'Day revealed that she would have her own reality television show for which she would be filming in the spring of 2010. The show entitled All About Aubrey premiered on March 7, 2011, on the Oxygen Network. O'Day's debut single, the Adonis-produced "Automatic" was released on April 12, 2011 & has sold 50,000 copies to date hitting the top 20 on iTunes pop charts in less than 2 hours. O'Day recorded over 50 songs for her debut album on SRC/Universal Motown, which was supposed to come out in late 2012.

O'Day was also fired from NBC's The Celebrity Apprentice 5, which premiered on February 19, 2012. Before being fired, O'Day received a significant amount of criticism for her conduct while competing on the show, being described as "narcissistic, self-centered, evil, and vicious" by the media and viewers of the show, and as "transparent" by Trump's judges. It eventually caused Arsenio Hall to lash out on her in the show's boardroom segment, berating her with the unanimous support of his team, particularly Clay Aiken. This left O'Day in tears and contemplating quitting the show before eventually being fired by Trump. O'Day ultimately decided not to quit, but was fired shortly thereafter.  Although she accepted an apology from Hall, she has expressed her dislike of him in multiple confessionals, labeling him and Aiken as "bullies". However, the contestants praised her creativity and business skills, and she ended up finishing in 3rd place, being the last female contestant standing. The reason for her firing was that she was too young and inexperienced, and also was seen as transparent by John Rich and Marlee Matlin, who served as Trump's viceroys.

On April 23, 2012, a new self-released single "Wrecking Ball", co-written and co-produced by American Idol alumni Pia Toscano was released on iTunes and sold 3,000 downloads in the first week. She shot a video for the track with music director Rage in June 2012 and was released on September 26, 2012, on Vevo.

2012–present: Between Two Evils, Danity Kane reunion, and Dumblonde
In 2012, O'Day announced she would be recording her debut solo EP.  On December 31, 2012, she performed previously released material, as well as three new songs from her EP Between Two Evils, "Love Me When You Leave", "Let Me Lay" and  "Before I Drown" in Las Vegas. In June 2013, O'Day performed her singles "Automatic" and "Before I Drown" on The CW's Oh Sit! and also performed at Chicago's Pride Fest. "Between Two Evils" was released on iTunes on August 13, 2013, after topping the iTunes US Dance Chart on pre-order sales alone, and reaching #5 on the iTunes US Pop Chart.

In mid-2013, there were rumors that Danity Kane would be reuniting. On August 25, 2013, Danity Kane appeared at the 2013 MTV Video Music Awards (without D. Woods, who did not return to the group), announcing they were back together. They soon split again, and O'Day and Shannon Bex announced the release of the band's third and final album, "DK3".

In early 2015, choosing to continue making music together, O'Day and Bex announced their duo music project, Dumblonde with the same manager as the Danity Kane band, Johnny Wright. In August 2016, she returned to reality television by taking part in the eighteenth series of the British show Celebrity Big Brother, where she sailed straight through to the finals, after never facing the public vote and finished in fifth place.

On July 7, 2021, O'Day released a single, "Body Love High".

Other work

In 2008, O'Day ranked #86 on Maxim's Hot 100 list, #81 on Blender's 100 Hottest People list, and posed for the magazines. She walked the catwalk at Heatherette's Fall 2007 runway show at Mercedes-Benz Fashion Week held on February 6, and recorded the song "Do Yo Dance" with R&B singer Cupid which was the released as a single from Cupid's album Time for a Change.

In January 2008, O'Day briefly became the face of Famous Stars and Straps. In August 2008, she  made a cameo appearance in Estelle's music video for "Pretty Please". Further utilizing her success, she started her own clothing line called Heart on My Sleeve, which features T-shirts and accessories available only online. She posed topless in the November 2008 issue of men's magazine Complex. The publication stated, "With all due respect to the other girls in Danity Kane, it's easy to see why [Combs] built his group around Aubrey O'Day. Simply put, Aubrey is that chick: the stunner who attracts paparazzi and Broadway producers alike, and the talent least likely to fall into post-reality-show abyss." The magazine additionally commented on the animosity O'Day receives from several outlets, such as blog sites, as well as from message board fans, who have come to despise the attention she attracts from the media and the current image she has crafted of herself.

In late 2008, O'Day made a guest appearance on the reality show 50 Cent: The Money and the Power. She later agreed to be the covergirl for Playboy for the March 2009 issue. Additionally, she has been featured on the covers of Jadore, Image, Palm Springs Life, King, Right On!, Dub and Envy. She has done features for GQ, In Touch Weekly and Us Weekly. In 2013, she was a guest judge for episode eight in season five of RuPaul's Drag Race. In 2016, she was a contestant on Celebrity Big Brother UK Season 18.

Personal life and activism
While attending University of California Irvine, O'Day spent a semester at sea. She worked with service organizations while touring in different countries, as well as refugee centers, orphanages, and mostly with children with AIDS. She volunteered for The Pink Project (a charity photobook supporting RAINN and the Los Angeles Breast Cancer Alliance), and helped victims of the Hurricane Katrina devastation. O'Day soon created her own organization, called F*A*N (Fighting Aids Now). The charity's goal is to give therapy and art to children in hospitals. During the 2008 presidential election campaign in the United States, O'Day supported Barack Obama for President. She is also a supporter of LGBT rights and chose GLSEN as her charity for Celebrity Apprentice.

On The Wendy Williams Show on August 12, 2008, O'Day stated that she previously dated DJ Cassidy. She dispelled rumors of ever having plastic surgery or dating boss Sean Combs. In an August 2008 interview with Broadway.com, she said she was increasingly irritated with people pigeonholing her sexuality, stating that she looks for "incredible passion and honest love" and not at gender. When questioned by Us Weekly regarding rumors that she is a lesbian, O'Day did not confirm nor deny the speculation about her sexuality, and once again said that she could not say "one way or another" what her sexual orientation is at this point in her life. In 2019, she came out as sapiosexual. In 2009, while on the show Chelsea Lately, when asked about being bisexual, she replied, "Generally, I don't like to label myself... I want to find someone I'm passionate about, and I don't want to limit myself to one segment of the population." In 2019, O'Day discussed her 2011–2012 relationship with the then-married Donald Trump, Jr., saying that they thought of themselves as soulmates at the time.

Filmography and theatre

Television

Theatre

Discography

Extended plays

Singles

As lead artist

As featured artist

Music videos

References

External links

1984 births
Living people
American fashion designers
American women fashion designers
American LGBT rights activists
American women pop singers
American women singer-songwriters

Danity Kane members
People from La Quinta, California
Singers from San Francisco
Singing talent show winners
Participants in American reality television series
Songwriters from San Francisco
Bad Boy Records artists
SRC Records artists
Television personalities from California
Activists from California
21st-century American women singers
The Apprentice (franchise) contestants
Big Brother (British TV series) contestants
21st-century American singers
Singer-songwriters from California
Sapiosexual people